Tisis nemophorella is a moth in the family Lecithoceridae. It was described by Francis Walker in 1864. It is found on Borneo.

Adults are cupreous, the forewings chalybeous (steel blue), with a cupreous band before the middle, and with a luteous (muddy-yellow) slightly oblique cupreous-bordered band beyond the middle.

References

Moths described in 1864
Tisis